Communal elections were held in Cambodia for the first time on 3 February 2002.

Results

References

 

2002 in Cambodia
Cambodia
Communal elections in Cambodia